Pereshchepnoye is a rural locality (a selo) in Mokroolkhovskoye Rural Settlement, Kotovsky District, Volgograd Oblast, Russia. The population was 441 as of 2010. There are 11 streets.

Geography 
Pereshchepnoye is located on Volga Upland, on the Mokraya Olkhovka River, 42 km northeast of Kotovo (the district's administrative centre) by road. Mokraya Olkhovka is the nearest rural locality.

References 

Rural localities in Kotovsky District